Aashti is a Pakistani drama television series that was aired on Hum TV. The producer is Mehroz Karim; it is written by Seema Ghazal and directed by Adnan Wai Qureshi.

Plot
Ashti is the story of a Bengali girl (Resham) who works as a maid for Abrash's (Humayun Saeed) affluent family. Ashti is engaged to Nazrul Islam (Faisal Qureshi) but is secretly in love with Abrash who sympathizes with her and encourages her to pursue her education. However, she soon discovers that Abrash is to marry Zarnish (Angeline Malik).

Events take a turn when Abrash and Zarnish's relationship faces problems. After a heated quarrel, Zarnish leaves for London and Abrash follows her to take a final decision once and for all. Meanwhile, Ashti also travels there, and before any decision can be taken, to complicate matters further, Ali Alam (Sajid Hasan) Arshi's father also appears on the scene.

Cast
 Resham as Aashti
 Faisal Qureshi as Nazar ul Islam
 Humayun Saeed as Abrash
 Sajid Hasan as Ali Alam; Abrash's father
 Seemi Pasha as Sherry; Abrash's mother (dead)
 Angeline Malik as Zarnish; Abrash's father
 Madiha Iftikhar as Aqeela; Saeed's wife
 Fahad Mustafa as Saeed; Aqeela's husband
 Salma Zafar as Zamani, Naz ul Islam and Saeed's mother
 Parveen Akbar as Jameela, Aashti's mother
 Sohail Asghar as Aashti's father
 Waqar Kayani as Saeed and Nazrul Islam's father
 Rashid Farooqui
 Farah Nadir as Khala

Accolades

Nominations
 Lux Style Awards - Best Television Actress - Resham
 Lux Style Awards - Best Television Writer - Seema Ghazal
 Lux Style Awards - Best Television Director - Adnan Wai Qureshi
 Lux Style Awards - Best Television Serial

See also 
 Noorpur Ki Rani
 Mannchalay
 Manay Na Ye Dil
 Malaal
 Bengalis in Pakistan

References

External links
 

2009 Pakistani television series debuts
2009 Pakistani television series endings
Pakistani drama television series
Urdu-language television shows
Television shows set in Karachi
Hum TV original programming